Virtutech was a company founded in 1998 as a spin-off from the Swedish Institute of Computer Science (SICS), to commercially develop its Simics computer architecture simulator software. In 2004, Virtutech accepted investment and moved headquarters to San Jose, California, USA. In 2010, Virtutech was wholly acquired by Intel and became part of Intel's Wind River subsidiary. In 2018, Wind River was sold to TPG Capital, which continues to develop Simics under the Wind River brand. The Stockholm site remains the center of Simics R&D.

Simics software is used by teams of software developers to simulate computer systems. This facilitates the development, testing, and debugging of embedded software that runs devices such as high-end servers, network hardware, aerospace/military vehicles, and automobiles. Simics allows embedded software developers to create virtual models of hardware using an ordinary desktop computer, run specified sets of tests, and walk the programs through each step of execution, both forwards and backwards.

History 

In 2001, AMD and Virtutech began working collaboratively on simulation for AMD's Hammer chips. In July 2005, IBM selected Virtutech Simics for development of its POWER6 platform. In 2007, Virtutech and Freescale announced a collaboration program around multicore processors. Virtutech thus appears to have a customer base that is partly in the embedded software world, and partly in the general computing and server world.

Virtutech was a member of Power.org.

As embedded systems become more complex, especially with the advent of multiprocessors, it has become increasingly difficult to develop and debug embedded software without the use of specialized tools. Virtutech's idea is to provide tools that allow developers to develop software faster than they would using hardware and traditional development methods. In particular, by modeling a complex hardware system using software running on an ordinary workstation computer, Virtutech claims to reduce the challenge of embedded software development.

On February 5, 2010, Intel announced that it had acquired Virtutech and that Simics will now be maintained by Intel's subsidiary Wind River Systems. The price of the acquisition was $45M.

References
EE Times - Virtutech system-level simulator features Hindsight technology

Notes

External links 
Virtutech
Simics

Software companies based in California
Companies based in San Jose, California
Companies established in 1998
Electronic design automation companies
Emulation software
Simulation software
Virtual machines
Intel acquisitions
Defunct software companies of the United States